Kurt Wöss also Kurt Woess (2 May 1914, in Linz, Austria – 4 December 1987, in Dresden, Germany) was an Austrian conductor and musicologist.

Wöss was principal conductor of the NHK Symphony Orchestra from 1951 to 1954.  From 1956 to 1959 he was chief conductor of the Melbourne Symphony Orchestra (then known as the Victorian Symphony Orchestra).

Decorations and awards
 Title of professor
 Austrian Cross of Honour for Science and Art, 1st class
 Anton Bruckner Interpretation Prize
 Gold Decoration of Honour for Services to the Republic of Austria
 Culture Medal of the City of Linz
 Honorary member of the Franz Schmidt community

References

1914 births
1987 deaths
Musicians from Linz
Male conductors (music)
Recipients of the Austrian Cross of Honour for Science and Art, 1st class
Recipients of the Decoration of Honour for Services to the Republic of Austria
20th-century Austrian conductors (music)
20th-century Austrian male musicians